The BHP Whyalla DH class were a class of diesel locomotives built by Walkers Limited, Maryborough for the BHP's Whyalla Steelworks between 1962 and 1968.

History
In 1962 three locomotives were purchased by BHP for use at its new Whyalla Steelworks. Initially used on construction trains until the facility opened in 1964. A further two were delivered in 1965. All were built for use on the standard gauge. In March 1968 a sixth was purchased for use on the narrow gauge line between Hummock Hill and the blast furnaces.

All six members of this class have been scrapped with DH1 being the last to be scrapped, having been transferred to Australian Southern Railroad when it took over OneSteel's rail operations in 2000.

Further reading
Men Steel and Rail by David Jehan Published by BHP 1999

References

BHP Tramways Centenary History David Griffiths Mile End Railway Museum
BHP Locomotives David Griffiths Railmac Publications
Locomotives of Australia By Leon Oberg

BHP Billiton diesel locomotives
Bo-Bo locomotives
Railway locomotives introduced in 1962
Walkers Limited locomotives
3 ft 6 in gauge locomotives of Australia